Save Me may refer to:

Film and television
 Save Me, a 1994 film starring Lysette Anthony
 Sauve-moi (Save Me), a 2000 French film directed by Christian Vincent
 Save Me (film), a 2007 American film directed by Robert Cary
 Save Me (American TV series), a 2013 sitcom
 Save Me (British TV series), a 2018–2020 drama serial
 Save Me (South Korean TV series), a 2017 drama series
 Save Me (web series), a 2017–2019 Canadian comedy-drama series
 "Save Me" (Grey's Anatomy), a 2005 television episode

Music

Albums
 Save Me (Clodagh Rodgers album) or the title song (see below), 1977
 Save Me (Pat McGee Band album), 2004
 Save Me (Silver Convention album) or the title song (see below), 1975
 Save Me (Future EP), 2019
 Save Me (Empress Of EP), 2022

Songs
 "Save Me" (Aimee Mann song), 1999
 "Save Me" (Big Country song), 1990
 "Save Me" (BTS song), 2016
 "Save Me" (Clodagh Rodgers song), 1977; covered by several performers
 "Save Me" (Darren Styles song), 2007
 "Save Me" (Dave Dee, Dozy, Beaky, Mick & Tich song), 1966
 "Save Me" (Embrace song), 2000
 "Save Me" (Fleetwood Mac song), 1990
 "Save Me" (Gotye song), 2012
 "Save Me" (Hinder song), 2012
 "Save Me" (Joelle Hadjia song), 2014
 "Save Me" (Queen song), 1980
 "Save Me" (RBD song), 2005
 "Save Me" (Remy Zero song), 2001
 "Save Me" (Shinedown song), 2005
 "Save Me" (Silver Convention song), 1974
 "Save Me" (Tara Lyn Hart song), 2000
 "Save Me" (The Tea Party song), 1993
 "Save Me" (Wiktoria song), 2016
 "Save Me (This Is an SOS)", by Elena Paparizou, 2013
 "Save Me (Wake Up Call)", by Unwritten Law, 2005
 "Namida no Niji"/"Save Me", by Aya Ueto, 2007
 "Save Me", by 2 Chainz from So Help Me God!, 2020
 "Save Me", by Alter Bridge from Elektra: The Album, 2005
 "Save Me", by Aretha Franklin from I Never Loved a Man the Way I Love You, 1967
 "Save Me", by Avenged Sevenfold from Nightmare, 2010
 "Save Me", by Baboon from Ed Lobster, 1991
 "Save Me", by Bonnie Tyler from Bitterblue, 1991
 "Save Me", by Brandon Lake from Help!, 2022
 "Save Me", by Damageplan from New Found Power, 2004
 "Save Me", by Dave Mason featuring Michael Jackson from Old Crest on a New Wave, 1980
 "Save Me", by Dave Matthews from Some Devil, 2003
 "Save Me", by Edguy from Rocket Ride, 2006
 "Save Me", by Fair Warning from Go!, 1997
 "Save Me", by Globus
 "Save Me", by Hanson from This Time Around, 2000
 "Save Me", by Hollaphonic & Xriss, 2020
 "Save Me", by Hollywood Undead from Day of the Dead, 2015
 "Save Me", by In Flames from Battles, 2016
 "Save Me", by Irma from Faces, 2014
 "Save Me", by Jem from Finally Woken, 2004
 "Save Me", by Johnny Logan from What's Another Year, 1980
 "Save Me", by k.d. lang from Ingénue, 1982
 "Save Me", by Kelly Osbourne from Sleeping in the Nothing, 2005
 "Save Me", by Keys N Krates, 2015
 "Save Me", by Killswitch Engage from Killswitch Engage, 2009
 "Save Me", by KMFDM from Attak, 2002
 "Save Me", by Krokus from One Vice at a Time, 1982
 "Save Me", by Lacuna Coil from Black Anima, 2019
 "Save Me", by Marc Broussard from Carencro, 2004
 "Save Me", by Marc E. Bassy, 2019
 "Save Me", by Melanie Safka from Photograph, 1976
 "Save Me", by Morandi featuring Helene from N3XT, 2007
 "Save Me", by Muse from The 2nd Law, 2012
 "Save Me", by Neil Diamond from On the Way to the Sky, 1981
 "Save Me", by Nicki Minaj from Pink Friday, 2010
 "Save Me", by Overkill from From the Underground and Below, 1997
 "Save Me", by Peter Cetera from One More Story, 1988
 "Save Me", by Poets of the Fall from Revolution Roulette, 2008
 "Save Me", by Public Image Ltd from Happy?, 1987
 "Save Me", by Royal Bliss from Life In-Between, 2009
 "Save Me", by Röyksopp from The Inevitable End, 2014
 "Save Me", by Skillet from Victorious, 2019
 "Save Me", by Smokey Robinson & the Miracles from Away We a Go-Go, 1966
 "Save Me", by Staind from The Illusion of Progress, 2008
 "Save Me", by Status Quo from In the Army Now, 1986
 "Save Me", by Steffany Gretzinger from Blackout, 2018
 "Save Me", by Village People from Live and Sleazy, 1979
 "Save Me", by Viva Hate, 2008
 "Save Me", by Wilson Pickett from Hey Jude, 1969
 "Save Me", by XXXTentacion from 17, 2017

Other uses
 Save Me (animal welfare), an animal protection organisation co-founded by Brian May
 Save Me (webtoon), a 2019 South Korean webtoon

See also
 
 Rescue Me (disambiguation)
 Rette mich (disambiguation)
 Save You (disambiguation)
 "Saved Me", a 1989 song by Jenny Morris